At the 2018 Winter Olympics, nineteen Nordic skiing events were contested – twelve cross-country skiing events, four ski jumping events, and three Nordic combined events.

See also 
 Cross-country skiing at the 2018 Winter Olympics
 Ski jumping at the 2018 Winter Olympics
 Nordic combined at the 2018 Winter Olympics

2018 Winter Olympics events
2018